"How You Want It?" (stylized as "HYWI?") is a song by American recording artist Teyana Taylor featuring King Combs. It was released as a single via GOOD Music and Def Jam Recordings on August 2, 2019. The song was written by Teyana Taylor, Sean Combs, Eric Bellinger, Nashiem Myrick, Mason Betha, Keisha Spivey, Curtis Mayfield, alongside its producers, BoogzDaBeast, Cardiak, and Hitmaka.

Composition
The song runs for 3 minutes and 42 seconds and samples Mase's "What You Want", which also contains a sample of Curtis Mayfield's "Right On The Darkness". The track contains "crisp drums and light guitars", as described by Hype Beast.

Promotion
Just a week prior to the song's release, she announced on Instagram its release date and a teaser for the music video.

Music video
The music video was released on the same day as the song's release on Taylor's YouTube channel. Directed by Taylor herself (under the name "Spike Tee"), it features footage of King Combs.

Synopsis
The music video opens with Teyana stares through a peephole while watching herself in various outfits. She then strips down while twerking on a white carpet in another throwback scene. Afterward, she appears in a scene of shiny suits. The final scenes conclude with a performance on a Las Vegas rooftop.

Critical reception
Tom Breiham of Stereogum described the song as "a sexed-up ’90s-style jam" and praised the song's lyrics for its "strutting, loping piece of dirty talk". In a HotNewHipHop article by Erika Marie, she applauds King Combs and the song's sample, stating "the track was a collaboration of Bad Boy Records artists in the heart of an era when the label was dropping hits left and right, so it seems only fitting that Diddy's son adds his flavor on Teyana's revision of the beat".

Credits and personnel
Adapted from Tidal and YouTube.

 Teyana Taylor – main artist, songwriting
 King Combs – featured artist
 Sean Combs – songwriting
 Hitmaka – production, songwriting
 BoogzDaBeast – production, songwriting, recording
 Cardiak – production, songwriting
 Nashiem Myrick – songwriting
 Mason Betha – songwriting
 Keisha Spivey – songwriting
 Curtis Mayfield – songwriting
 Eric Bellinger – songwriting
 Jaycen Joshua – mixing
 Jacob Richards – mixing assistance
 Mike Seaberg – mixing assistance

Charts

Certifications

Release history

References

2019 singles
2019 songs
Teyana Taylor songs
Songs written by Teyana Taylor
Songs written by Sean Combs
Songs written by Eric Bellinger
Songs written by Hitmaka
Songs written by Cardiak
Songs written by Curtis Mayfield
Songs written by Mase